Emmalocera aurifusellis is a species of snout moth in the genus Emmalocera. It was described by Francis Walker in 1866 and is known from India.

References

Moths described in 1866
Emmalocera